HMS Puncher is an  of the Royal Navy. She is permanently based at HMNB Portsmouth and forms part of the First Patrol Boat Squadron (1PBS). Puncher is primarily tasked with training the officer cadets and midshipmen of the University of London's University Royal Naval Unit (London URNU). She also provides a training platform for young officers undertaking training during the Royal Navy's initial warfare officers' course, and has also been used in the coastal protection role, most notably during Operation Olympic, the security operation surrounding the London 2012 Olympic Games.

Deployments
Puncher operates from HMNB Portsmouth conducting navigation training in and around the Solent. She also regularly deploys out of area, often in the company of other P2000s, with the task of providing practical navigation and seamanship training to the ship's students. Recent deployments have included the Baltic and Northern Europe. Puncher attended Kieler Woche ("Kiel Week") in 2011 with her sister ship  and ships from several navies.

Ship's company 
Puncher has a permanent crew of five regular Royal Navy personnel, one officer and four ratings, who fulfil the minimum necessary seagoing complement of the vessel. The ship's company is also regularly boosted by up to 12 (more typically 10) URNU officer cadets and midshipmen who are normally accompanied by a Royal Naval Reserve training officer. Alternately the berths may be used by any other personnel who are required to live aboard.

Affiliations
Like most Royal Navy ships, Puncher is affiliated with various organisations and a port:

702 Naval Air Squadron

Kensington and Chelsea Borough Council
Worshipful Company of Bakers
Seafarers UK
Little Ship Club
Town of Eastbourne
Eastbourne Sea Cadet Corps
Eastbourne Lifeboat
Royal Navy Old Comrades Club Eastbourne

Notes

References

External links

 

Archer-class patrol vessels
1988 ships